During the 2016–17 season Vitesse participated in the Dutch Eredivisie and the KNVB Cup. Vitesse would win the final of the KNVB Cup against AZ on 30 April 2017. It was the club's first major honour in their 120 plus year history.

Players

Squad details

Transfers

In

 

Total spending:  €600,000

Out

Total gaining:  €5,290,000

Balance
Total:  €4,690,000

Pre-season
On 21 June 2016, it was announced that Vitesse would host Belgian side Oostende for a pre-season friendly, as well as hosting the 2016 Fox Sports Cup, which features sides such as West Bromwich Albion and Porto.

Competitions

Overview

{| class="wikitable" style="text-align: center"
|-
!rowspan=2|Competition
!colspan=8|Record
|-
!
!
!
!
!
!
!
!
|-
| Eredivisie

|-
| KNVB Cup

|-
! Total

Eredivisie

League table

Results summary

Results by matchday

Matches

The fixtures for the 2016–17 season were announced on 21 June 2016 at 9am.

KNVB Cup

Statistics

Appearances

Top scorers
The list is sorted by shirt number when total goals are equal.

Clean sheets
The list is sorted by shirt number when total appearances are equal.

Summary

References

External links
Vitesse Official Website 

Dutch football clubs 2016–17 season
SBV Vitesse seasons